The Jesenice railway station is a railway station in the town of Jesenice, in northwestern Slovenia. It is operated by Slovenian Railways (SŽ).

Characteristics

The station is located in the Sava Dolinka valley, close to the borders with Austria in the north and with Italy in the west. It is the current northern terminus of the Bohinj Railway from Trieste, and also of the Tarvisio–Ljubljana Railway after the section to Tarvisio has been closed in 1967/69. From Jesenice, the Karawanks Railway line runs northwards, across the Austrian border in the Karawanks Tunnel opened in 1906, to Villach Hauptbahnhof.

In addition to the station facilities, the building contains a bar, shops, and a restaurant. The two boarding platforms are connected by an underground pedestrian tunnel.

Destinations
Destinations served from the station are:
Rosenbach (Slovene: Podrožca) and Villach (Slovene: Beljak) on the mainline to the north (both in Austria, via Karawanks Tunnel)
Kranj and Ljubljana on the Tarvisio-Ljubljana Railway line to the south-east
Bohinj and Nova Gorica on the Bohinj line to the south-west

History

The station opened in 1870 as a stop on the Tarvisio-Ljubljana Railway. In 1906, it became a junction when two main lines of the Cisleithanian "New Alpine Railways" project were completed: the Bohinj Railway (Wocheinerbahn) to Trieste and the Karawanks Tunnel to Villach and the present-day Austrian Rosental line to Sankt Veit.

Architecturally, the new building is unusually distinctive for a train station in the area, being a stark modernist box faced in white marble and featuring hexagonal windows.

External links

Railway stations in Slovenia
Jesenice, Jesenice